Oderen is a commune in the Haut-Rhin department in Grand Est in north-eastern France.

Geography

Climate
Oderen has a humid continental climate (Köppen climate classification Dfb) closely bordering on a subarctic climate (Dfc).

See also
 Communes of the Haut-Rhin department

References

Communes of Haut-Rhin